Light as a Feather is a 1973 album by Return to Forever.

Light as a Feather may also refer to:

 Light as a Feather, 1979 album by Azymuth
 Light as a Feather (TV series), an American TV series that premiered in 2018
 "Light as a Feather", a song by Chromatics from the album Closer to Grey

See also
 Light as a feather, stiff as a board, a children's levitation trick